The 1999–2000 Football League (known as the Nationwide Football League for sponsorship reasons) was the 101st completed season of The Football League.

The 1999–2000 season saw the league dispense with the traditional 1–11 numbering of players’ shirts in favour of squad numbers, a system that had been adopted by the Premier League a few seasons before. This also meant that players’ names appeared on the back of their shirts for the first time since the league’s inception.

The three promotion places in Division One went to champions Charlton Athletic, runners-up Manchester City and playoff winners Ipswich Town.

1999–2000 also saw some of Division One’s biggest clubs miss out on promotion — the biggest of these were Blackburn Rovers (11th) and Nottingham Forest (14th). Steve Coppell ended his fourth spell as Crystal Palace manager after doing wonders to keep a virtually bankrupt club clear of the Division One relegation zone.

Going down were Walsall, Port Vale and Swindon Town. West Bromwich Albion just missed out on the drop zone thanks to a late turn-around in form during the final weeks of the season which followed the appointment of Gary Megson as manager.

David Moyes, 37, showed promise as one of the league’s most highly rated young managers after he guided Preston North End to the Division Two championship. Stan Ternent’s two-year rebuilding project at Burnley paid off as they finished runners-up in the division and would establish themselves as a second tier side for nine years until promotion to the Premier League happened at the end of the 2008–09 season. Joining them in Division One were Peter Taylor’s Gillingham, who had reached the upper half of the league for the first time in their history.

Going down were Cardiff City, Blackpool, Scunthorpe United and Chesterfield. Narrowly avoiding the drop were Oxford United, who struggled all season long despite the club’s financial crisis being eased by the arrival of new Tanzanian chairman Firoz Kassam.

Swansea City, Rotherham United, Northampton Town and Peterborough United occupied the four promotion places in Division Three.

Chester City were relegated on the last day of the season, ending their 69-year league career and would be relegated from the League again nine years later while Shrewsbury Town and Carlisle United saved themselves from Conference football.

First Division

Location of clubs

Play-offs

Results

Second Division

Location of clubs

Play-offs

Results

Third Division

Locations of clubs

Play-offs

See also
 1999-2000 in English football
 1999 in association football
 2000 in association football

References

 
English Football League seasons
2